Steve Williams may refer to:

Music
 Steve Williams (born 1953), drummer for the Welsh rock band Budgie
 Steve Williams (jazz drummer) (born 1956), Shirley Horn's accompanist and band leader
 Stezo or Steve Williams (born 1969), rapper
 Steve Williams (keyboardist) (born 1971), keyboardist for Power Quest

Sports

Association football (soccer)
 Steve Williams (footballer, born 1958), English midfielder for Southampton and Arsenal
 Steve Williams (footballer, born 1974), Welsh goalkeeper with Drogheda United
 Steve Williams (footballer, born 1983), English goalkeeper for Wycombe Wanderers
 Steve Williams (footballer, born 1987), English defender for Macclesfield

Rugby
 Steve Williams (rugby union, born 1958), Australian national team captain
 Steve Williams (rugby union, born 1970), Wales international rugby union player
 Steve Williams (rugby union, born 1982), Australian-born German rugby union international

Other sports
 Steve Williams (sprinter) (born 1953), American track and field sprinter
 Steve Williams (wrestler) (1960–2009), American wrestler
 Steve Williams (caddie) (born 1963), New Zealand golf caddy
 Steve Williams (cyclist) (born 1973), Australian cyclist
 Steve Williams (rower) (born 1976), British rower
 Steve Williams (defensive end) (born 1981), gridiron football player
 Steve Williams (cornerback) (born 1991), American football cornerback

Other uses
 Steve Williams (politician) (born 1951), judge and former politician in Ohio
 Steve Williams (animator) (born 1962), Canadian animator and special effects artist
 Stephen T. Williams, mayor of Huntington, West Virginia
 Steve Williams (businessman), Canadian businessman
 Steve Williams (Brickleberry), character from Brickleberry

See also
 Stevie Williams (born 1979), professional skateboarder
 Stephen Williams (disambiguation), also Steven